Sudislav Vladimirovich was Prince of Pskov. He was imprisoned by his brother, Yaroslav the Wise, Grand Prince of Kiev in about 1035. He was liberated from the prison in 1059 and died as a monk in a monastery in Kiev in 1063.

Life
He was the youngest son of Vladimir the Great, Grand Prince of Kiev. His mother's name is unknown. 
He received the Principality of Pskov from his father. His brother,
Grand Prince Yaroslav the Wise seized and incarcerated him around 1035. Around that time Sudislav was the only surviving brother of Yaroslav the Wise who attempted to secure the succession for his own sons.

Sudislav spent about 25 years in prison before his three nephewsIziaslav of Kiev, Sviatoslav of Chernigov, and Vsevolod of Pereyaslavset him free in 1059. On his release, Sudislav was forced to swear an "oath of fealty" to them and to take "the monastic habit", according to the Russian Primary Chronicle.  Sudislav settled in the Monastery of Saint George in Kiev where he died in 1063.

References

Sources

The Russian Primary Chronicle: Laurentian Text (Translated and edited by Samuel Hazzard Cross and Olgerd P. Sherbowitz-Wetzor) (1953). Medieval Academy of America. .

Year of birth missing
1063 deaths
Princes of Pskov
Children of Vladimir the Great